Elsenham railway station is on the West Anglia Main Line serving the village of Elsenham in Essex, England. Its three-letter station code is ESM.

The station and all trains serving it are operated by Greater Anglia.

The ticket office (on the London-bound platform) is staffed part-time, there are self-service ticket machines on each of the platforms (which are staggered, the country-bound being north of a level crossing and the London-bound being south of it) and a permit to travel machine is also available. Electronic real-time departure boards are available on both platforms.

Facilities 
There is a cafe (in 2019) adjoining the Cambridge-bound platform: Jeff & Eddie's Railside Cafe which opens early morning and closes at 15.30.

There is a footbridge and a level crossing connecting the platforms.

History
Elsenham station was opened in 1845 and retains its original layout with staggered platforms on either side of a level crossing.

From 1913 to 1952 it was the junction for the Elsenham & Thaxted Light Railway.

Crossing accident

On 3 December 2005, Class 158 Express Sprinter unit 158856 struck and killed two teenage girls on the station pedestrian crossing, next to the manually-operated level crossing, between the staggered platforms. Although flashing red lights and a klaxon indicated that a train was approaching, it is likely that they thought these applied to the train they wanted to catch to Cambridge, which was just arriving at the opposite platform. The curvature of the line gives only three seconds visibility of an approaching non-stopping train. A fatality in the same circumstances had occurred in 1989.

Previous risk assessments carried out by Network Rail in 2002 had identified potential dangers with the crossing and recommended the installation of gates that would lock automatically as trains approached, but this was not acted upon. In 2012 Network Rail was prosecuted for breaching health and safety laws and fined £1 million for the accident.

Since the accident, Network Rail responded to requests from the girls' families and erected a footbridge and installed locking gates at the foot crossing in 2007. The accident led to a complete review by the Rail Accident Investigation Branch of all pedestrian level crossings at stations.

Services
All services at Elsenham are operated by Greater Anglia using  EMUs.

The typical off-peak service in trains per hour is:
 1 tph to London Liverpool Street
 1 tph to 

During the peak hours, the service is increased to 2 tph in each direction.

References

External links

 Railways Archive account including RAIB report

Station on navigable O.S. map

Grade II listed buildings in Essex
DfT Category E stations
Railway stations in Essex
Former Great Eastern Railway stations
Railway stations in Great Britain opened in 1845
Greater Anglia franchise railway stations
Elsenham